Glaring Through Oblivion is a 2011 book of poetry written by Serj Tankian, the Armenian-American lead singer of the band System of a Down. It is his second book of poetry, after Cool Gardens (2002). Glaring Through Oblivion was published by HarperCollins Publishers and printed in China, and released on March 22, 2011.

The book begins with a prose essay, written several days after the September 11 attacks, about how Tankian feared to speak his opinions because of threats against him and his band, after he had written an essay two days after the attacks in which he blamed United States foreign policy for terrorism. The prose ends with Serj promising "I, myself, have vowed to never ever again hold my tongue."

Some of the poems contain lyrics that ended up in some of his songs, although sometimes a bit modified. Some poems consist of only one line and do not have a title. The last poem in the book, "Borders", actually was to become a whole song on his second album Imperfect Harmonies; the song "Borders Are..." contains elements of that poem as well as from several poems from cool gardens.

Poem listing
A few days after September 11th (prose)
Deaf Nation
Down with the System
The Hand
Civilization
Countless Manipulations
We intend to rest through motion, speak through silence, and fight through peace.
The Fool
Antwerp Melting
Remote Viewing
World of Words
Blindness serves not God, but man.
 #82
Vermillion
Home is a place you can't walk away from, in the end.
You speak to millions but talk to no one.
Lovely in love, ugly in death, better than sex in Turkish prisons, safer than cement condoms.
The messenger speaks through chaos
Los Angeles
Dates, Rates, Plates, Fates, Mates, and Kates
I'm being chased by children playing miniature toy accordions made in China.
The Void (was already published in Cool Gardens)
Life Savers  (already on Cool Gardens)
She sells sea shells, buy the real whore!
The blind man cannot see all the marchers on the opposite side.
Salivation
I adore the whore who calls herself reality.
Claustrophobia
Uncertainty
Condemned
The Teacher
The Nerves of Them
Spare Me the Night
Poisoning Poseidon
Fancy fucking you here!
Nothing
Diatribe Trivialities
Picture Frame
Undying Form
Bottled Water
Soon
The Silk Weaver
Life is a potato pancake being eaten by fireflies in the middle of Ohio.
Time
Heretics
The Incandescent Pause
Awareness
Forgot to Remember
Praying for Peace
Encore, you whore, get us more of that unfailing drink we called for.
Borders

References

Glaring Through Oblivion. Words  2011 by Serj Tankian

Glaring Through Oblivion (Hardcover)

http://rockdirt.com/serj-tankian-calls-into-howard-stern/94/

Serj Tankian himself reading 'The Nerves of Them'

System of a Down
HarperCollins books
2011 poetry books
Books by Serj Tankian